Technical research ships were used by the United States Navy during the 1960s to gather intelligence by monitoring, recording and analyzing wireless electronic communications of nations in various parts of the world. At the time these ships were active, the mission of the ships was covert and discussion of the true mission was prohibited ("classified information"). The mission of the ships was publicly given as conducting research into atmospheric and communications phenomena. However, the true mission was more or less an open secret and the ships were commonly referred to as "spy ships".

Function 

These ships carried a crew of U.S. Navy personnel whose specialty was intercepting wireless electronic communications and gathering intelligence from those communications (signals intelligence, communications intelligence, and electronic signals intelligence (SIGINT)). In the 1960s those personnel had a U.S. Navy rating of Communications Technician (later changed to Cryptologic Technician), or CT.

In order to transmit intelligence information that had been gathered back to United States for further processing and analysis, these ships had a special system named Technical Research Ship Special Communications, or TRSSCOM (pronounced tress-com).  This Earth-Moon-Earth (EME) communications system used a special gyroscope-stabilized  parabolic antenna, which can be seen aft of the main superstructure in the accompanying photographs of Belmont and Liberty. Radio signals were transmitted toward the moon, where they would bounce back toward the Earth and be received by a large  parabolic antenna at a Naval Communications Station in Cheltenham, Maryland (near Washington, D.C.) or Wahiawa, Hawaii. Communications could occur only when the moon was visible simultaneously at the ship's location and in Cheltenham or Wahiawa. The gyro stabilization of the antenna kept the antenna pointed at the moon while the ship rolled and pitched on the surface of the ocean.

These ships were classified as naval auxiliaries with a hull designation of AGTR, which stands for Auxiliary, General, Technical Research. Five of these ships were built with hull numbers of 1–5. The first three ships of this type (Oxford, Georgetown, and Jamestown) were converted from World War II-era Liberty ships. The last two ships (Belmont and Liberty) were converted from Victory ships.  The former Liberty ships' top speed of  limited the first three AGTRs to missions of slow steaming on station with a minimum of transits.  Victory ships' sustained speed of  enabled Belmont to shadow Mediterranean Sea operations of the Soviet helicopter carrier  in 1969.  All of the technical research ships were decommissioned and stricken by 1970.

One of these ships' crew received a Presidential Unit Citation for heroism in combat.   was attacked, severely damaged and 34 crew members killed by shelling, napalm bombing and torpedoing from Israeli jet fighter aircraft and motor torpedo boats on June 8, 1967.

The citation reads (in part) "For meritorious service from 1 November 1965 to 30 June 1969 while participating in combat support operations in Southeast Asia. Through research and the compilation of extremely valuable technical data, USS Jamestown and USS Oxford contributed most significantly to the overall security of the United States and other Free World forces operating in support of the Republic of Vietnam. Signed E.R. Zumwalt, Admiral, USN, Chief of Naval Operations."

For specifications of these ships, see Liberty ship and Victory ship.

Ships of the AGTR type
(dates of commissioning–decommissioning)
  (Liberty ship type)
 • 1961–1969
 • 1963–1969
 • 1963–1969
Belmont class (Victory ship type)
 • 1964–1970
 • 1964–1968

Environmental research ship (AGER)

Three smaller ships, former Army Freight Supply (FS) ships converted by Navy to Light Cargo Ship (AKL) vessels and then to Banner-class environmental research ships(AGER) had a similar mission. In contrast to the high freeboard of the AGTR Liberty and Victory hulls, the AGER decks were low and vulnerable to boarding from small craft.  , technically still in commission, has been held by North Korea since its attack and capture by on January 23, 1968.

Ships of the AGER type
  (redesignated from AKL-25/T-AKL-25, ex Army FS-345)
  (redesignated from AKL-44, ex Army FS-344)
  (redesignated from AKL-45, ex U.S. Army FS-217)

Auxiliary General (AG) USNS ships 

Three technical research ships were operated as USNS ships with a Military Sea Transportation Service civilian crew and a Navy detachment conducting the mission operations. Two ships were Maritime Commission C1-M-AV1 types. One, was a VC2-S-AP2 (Victory) type that operated in this role December 1962-April 1964 before being reclassified AK‑274 and resuming cargo operations.

  (Maritime Commission C1-M-AV1 type)
  (Maritime Commission VC2-S-AP2 (Victory) type)
  (Maritime Commission C1-M-AV1 type)

See also
 Spy ship
 , modified for electronic surveillance in El Salvador and Nicaragua area (1985-1987).
 List of research vessels – United States
 Naval trawler

References

External links
The "Special Project Fleet" 1961-69, 1985-89 in America's Cold War Infrastructure by Al Grobmeier
Unofficial ship pages:
USS Oxford — Navsource Online
USS Oxford
USS Georgetown
USS Jamestown
USS Jamestown
USS Belmont
USS Liberty memorial
USS Liberty

Espionage techniques
Espionage devices
Pueblo
United States Navy in the 20th century
Signals intelligence
Ship types